The men's 4 × 400 metres relay event at the 1951 Pan American Games was held at the Estadio Monumental in Buenos Aires on 6 March.

Results

References

Athletics at the 1951 Pan American Games
1951